Republican is an unincorporated community in Faulkner County, Arkansas, United States.

The Castleberry-Harrington Historic District and the Farris and Evelyn Langley House, which are listed on the National Register of Historic Places, are both near the community.

References

Unincorporated communities in Faulkner County, Arkansas
Unincorporated communities in Arkansas